Fernleigh, Nova Scotia  is a residential subdivision in Fairview on  Mainland Halifax within the Halifax Regional Municipality Nova Scotia on the shore of the Bedford Basin in Halifax Harbour.

References
 Destination Nova Scotia

Communities in Halifax, Nova Scotia